Gilberto “Giba” Damiano Maciel, Jr. is a Brazilian football manager, formerly managing the US Virgin Islands team.

Giba Damiano has started his coaching career in England which involved short spells at the academy system working with Cardiff City, and helping implementing the Futsal into Football project at Crystal Palace.

He moved his coaching education journey to Scotland, 2018 to 2022 where he got his UEFA Pro license certificate.

US Virgin Islands 

Giba was hired in 2018 as assistant coach of the U.S. Virgin Islands men's senior national team ahead of World Cup qualifiers, the CONCACAF Gold Cup, and the CONCACAF Nations Cup.

In 2019 he was appointed U.S. Virgin Islands Head Coach and General Manager of National team. 

Futsal into football 

In 2012 Giba Damiano was invited to observe the Brazilian Futsal National team in Thailand. This opportunity was key for the creation of the futsal to football style of play that has become his trademark as a football coach.

Coaching career
From 2012 to 2014, Damiano held a coaching role at Cardiff City. In October 2019, Damiano was appointed manager of the US Virgin Islands and their under-23 side.

References

1976 births
Date of birth missing (living people)
Living people
Brazilian football managers
Brazilian expatriate sportspeople in the United States Virgin Islands
United States Virgin Islands national soccer team managers
Cardiff City F.C. non-playing staff
Expatriate soccer managers in the United States Virgin Islands
Brazilian expatriate football managers